Phacelia brachyloba is a species of phacelia known by the common name shortlobe phacelia. It is native to southern California and Baja California, where it grows in the coastal mountains, canyons, and valleys.  It is one of the many species known as fire followers, that emerge in areas recently burned.

It is an annual herb growing erect to a maximum height near 60 centimeters. It is hairy and glandular. The lance-shaped leaves are lobed or divided into lobed leaflets. The hairy, glandular inflorescence is a one-sided curving or coiling cyme of many funnel- or bell-shaped flowers. Each flower is up to a centimeter wide with a lavender, pink, or white corolla and a yellow throat.

There are reports that glandular hairs of stems, flowers and leaves of Phacelia brachyloba secrete oil droplets that can cause an unpleasant skin rash (contact dermatitis) in some people.

References

External links
Jepson Manual Treatment
Photo gallery

brachyloba
Flora of California
Flora of Baja California
Natural history of the California chaparral and woodlands
Natural history of the California Coast Ranges
Natural history of the Peninsular Ranges
Natural history of the Santa Monica Mountains
Natural history of the Transverse Ranges
Flora without expected TNC conservation status